

League standings
 The first four teams Qualify to Qatar Cup.

References

Volleyball in Qatar